The New Westminster Frasers were a minor league baseball team located in British Columbia, Canada. The Frasers were members of the short-season Class A Northwest League for a single season in 1974. The comedic exploits of the Frasers are chronicled in the book Burning Up the Infield: The 1974 Frasers co-authored by Ken McIntosh and Rod Drown. The book was later adapted as a stage play performed by City Stage New West.

History
Playing as an independent club, the Frasers would be required to source their own players. The club also held regional tryouts. In a game that would be the last in the franchise's short existence, New Westminster closed out the season losing 14-0 against Seattle. The Frasers 34-50 placed the team at the bottom of the division standings. Prior to the 1975 season the New Westminster franchise was moved to Boise were it continued play as the Boise A's.

Ballpark
The Frasers played at Queen's Park Stadium.

Season-by-season record

References

External links
 Statistics from Baseball-Reference
 Statistics from Stats Crew

Baseball teams established in 1974
Baseball teams disestablished in 1974
Defunct baseball teams in Canada
Defunct Northwest League teams